Sudiste may refer to several places in Estonia:

Sudiste, Jõgeva County, village in Palamuse Parish, Jõgeva County
Sudiste, Viljandi County, village in Karksi Parish, Viljandi County